Elizabeth Beachbard ( – 1861) was an American photographer, and ambrotypist.

She held a ‘ambrotype saloon’ at S. Rampart Street, New Orleans. She photographed Confederate soldiers at Camp Moore.

Beachbard died at Camp Moore on 22 November 1861.

References 

1861 deaths
American photographers